Patrick Joseph Greene (March 20, 1875 – October 20, 1934) was a professional baseball player. He played parts of two seasons in Major League Baseball for the Philadelphia Phillies, New York Highlanders and Detroit Tigers in 1902 and 1903. He batted and threw right-handed.

He was born and died in Providence, Rhode Island.

References

External links

Major League Baseball third basemen
New York Highlanders players
Philadelphia Phillies players
Detroit Tigers players
Derby Angels players
Rochester Patriots players
Ottawa Wanderers players
Providence Clamdiggers (baseball) players
Pawtucket Colts players
Taunton Herrings players
Nashua (minor league baseball) players
Canton Watchmakers players
Erie Sailors players
Baseball players from Rhode Island
1875 births
1934 deaths
Jackson Convicts players
New Bedford Whalers (baseball) players